The Haryana Police Department is the law enforcement agency for the state of Haryana, India. Present DGP of Haryana Police is P. K. Agarwal since August 16, 2021. He is an IPS officer of 1988 batch.

History
The Haryana Police were formed when the state of Haryana was established after bifurcation from the state of Punjab on 1 November 1966. The organisation is governed by the "Punjab Police rules" which were framed in 1934; however, the State Government passed its police act in 2008. The same police practices being followed by police organisations in North India. At the time when the state of Haryana was established, the organisation had the responsibility for enforcement of the law in 6 districts and had a strength of 12,165 personnel with Commando wing.

FIR (First Immediate Response) application is an SOS/emergency mobile application that helps its user seek immediate help from Police with a single click of a help button to be used by women, senior citizens and anyone who needs Police help in an emergency situation. FIR app was launched in Faridabad, Haryana by the Hon. CM Shri Manohar Lal Khattar and Commissioner of Police Faridabad and CEO Haryana Waqf Board Dr. Hanif Qureshi, IPS, on 17 April 2016.

Organisational structure

Haryana Police comes under direct control of Department of Home Affairs, Government of Haryana.
The Haryana Police is headed by Home Minister.

State Police Headquarters located in Sector 6, Panchkula. The total headcount of the personnel working in Haryana Police at present is 56,747.

Haryana Armed Police (HAP) has 5 battalions, 3 at Madhuban, one at Hisar and one at Ambala.

Haryana Police has wireless repeater antennae in three locations, at Tosham Hill range in Bhiwani district, Tankri hill in Rewari district and at Sarahan hill in Himachal Pradesh. Police HQ uses Sarahan tower to transmit signals to Tosham Hill. Tosham Hill tower boosts and sends the signal to Tankri Hill. Tosham Hill tower cover the signals area of Bhiwani, Hisar, Fatehabad, Sirsa, Rohtak, Sonipat and Jhajjhar district Police Headquarters. Tankri Hill tower covers the Gurugram, Faridabad, Palwal, Nuh, Rewari, Narnaul and Haryana Bhawan Delhi.

Hierarchy
Officers
Director General of Police (DGP)
Additional Director General of Police
Inspector General of Police (IGP)
Deputy Inspector General of Police 
Senior Superintendent of Police
Superintendent of Police (SP)
Additional Superintendent of Police 
Assistant SP (IPS) or Deputy SP (HPS)

Sub-ordinates
Inspector of Police 
Sub-Inspector of Police (SI)
Assistant Sub-Inspector of Police (ASI)
Head Constable
Constable
SPOs

Control Center 
Haryana Police has a control room No 112 and special Women Helpline no of 1091 which can be called from any landline or mobile phone.

See also

 Crime reporting and tracking
 Bureau of Police Research and Development (BPRD)
 Call 112
 Criminal record
 Crime and Criminal Tracking Network and Systems (CCTNS)
 Law enforcement in India
 National Crime Records Bureau (NCRB)
 Sex offender registry (SOR)
 United Nations Office on Drugs and Crime (UNODC)
 Other police related
 Indian Police Foundation and Institute
 Sardar Vallabhbhai Patel National Police Academy

References

Police
State law enforcement agencies of India
Police
Police
Recipients of the Rashtriya Khel Protsahan Puruskar
Government agencies established in 1966